The 1953 Texas A&M Aggies football team represented Texas A&M University in the 1953 college football season as a member of the Southwest Conference (SWC). The Aggies were led by head coach Raymond George in his third season and finished with a record of four wins, five losses and one tie (4–5–1 overall, 1–5 in the SWC).

Schedule

References

Texas AandM
Texas A&M Aggies football seasons
Texas AandM Aggies football